Ronin Publishing, Inc. is a small press in Berkeley, California, founded in 1983 and incorporated in 1985, which publishes books as tools for personal development, visionary alternatives, and expanded consciousness. The company's tagline is "Life Skills with Attitude!" In a 1996 Publishers Weekly profile, the company describes itself as a "strong player in the hemp and psychedelia market" that has little competition from major publishers. 

Ronin's catalog includes the Leary Library, The Lilly Library, The Fringe Series, The Entheo-Spirituality Series, and various books on psychedelia. 

The company has been subpoenaed by the Drug Enforcement Administration to provide names and addresses for people having purchased their books on marijuana horticulture. A number of their books are reprints of out-of-print works from the 1960s and 1970s — including a number of titles published by Ronin's predecessor, And/Or Press — on the psychedelic experience and related subjects.

In 2006, Ronin republished the 1963 Discordian religious text Principia Discordia with altered text, altered images, and a new name, so Ronin could copyright the work. This action offended many fans of the original work, whose authors, Greg Hill (Malaclypse the Younger) and Kerry Thornley, had died several years previously. Malaclypse the Younger, et el purposefully put their book, Principle Discordia into the public domain outside of copyright. Beverly Potter then created a derivative of the work, as she did with eleven Timothy Leary and three John  C. Lilly works.

Titles published

Timothy Leary Library 
 (original date of publication; Ronin edition)
 Start Your Own Religion (1967; 2004)
 High Priest (1968; 1995)
 The Politics of Ecstasy (1968; 1998)
 Psychedelic Prayers (1972; 1997)
 Chaos & CyberCulture (1994) — Leary's last published work before his death
 Turn On Tune In Drop Out (1999) 
 Change Your Brain (2000)
 Politics of Self-Determination (2000)
 Your Brain is God (2001)
 Politics of PsychoPharmacology (2001)
 Musings on Human Metamorphoses (2003) 
 Evolutionary Agents (2004)
 The Fugitive Philosopher (2007)

Other titles (selected) 
 Mary Baker, Citizen Ninja (2016) 
 Richard Boire, JD. Marijana Law (1995) 
 Richard Boire, JD. Sacred Mushrooms & the Law 
 Ernest Callenbach, Living Cheaply With Style: Live Better and Spend Less (1993) 
 William L. Conwill, PhD, Training Black Spirit  (2116) 
 Bruce Eisner, Ecstasy: The MDMA Story (1989, 1994 revised ed) 
 Mark James Estren, A History of Underground Comics (1993)  — one of the few reference works on underground comix
 Mark James Estren, A History of Underground Comics, 20th Anniversary Edition (2012)  — includes some updates and some all-new material
 Mark James Estren, PhD., Prescription Drug Abuse (2013) 
 Stephen Gaskin, Amazing Dope Tales (1999) 
 Original authors, Greg Hill and Kerry Wendell Thornley (not their title), Discordia: Hail the Goddess of Chaos and Confusion (2006) 

 Mike Marinacci, California Jesus 9781579512309 (2107)
 Francis Moraes, The Little Book of Opium (2003) 
 Beverly A. Potter and Sebastian Orfali. Brain Boosters: Foods & Drugs That Make You Smarter (July 1993) , 
 Beverly A. Potter, PhD, Overcoming Job Burnout (1980) 
 Beverly A. Potter and Sebastian Orfali, Drug Testing at Work, (1995) 
 Beverly A. Potter, PhD, Pass the Test (2000) 
 Beverly A. Potter, PhD, Managing Yourself for Excellence, (2009) 
 Beverly A. Potter, Ph.D. and Mark J. Estren, Ph.D., Question Authority to Think for Yourself (2012) 
 Beverly A. Potter, PhD, Cannabis for Seniors (2017) 
 Beverly A. Potter, PhD, Heal Yourself: How to Harness Pleccbo Power (2113) 
 Beverly A. Potter, PhD, Animal House of Acid: A Memoir (2015) 
 Beverly A. Potter, PhD, The Worrywart's Companion (1996) 
 Beverly A. Potter, PhD. From Conflict to Cooperation (1994) 
 Beverly A. Potter, PhD, The Way of the Ronin (1985) 
 Beverly A. Potter, PhD, Patriot's Handbook (2010) 
 Carl A. P. Ruck, PhD Sacred Mushrooms & the Goddess (2011) 
 Carl A. P. Ruck, PhD Entheogens, Myth & Human Consciousness (2013) 
 David Hillman, PhD Gynomorphs: Goddesses with Peninses (2012) 
 David Hillman, PhD Original Sin: Ritual Child Rape & the Church (2013) 
 Alexander Shulgin, Controlled Substances: Chemical & Legal Guide to Federal Drug Laws (1988) .
 Peter Stafford, Psychedelics (2003) 
 Larry Todd, Dr. Atomic's Marijuana Multiplier (1998 reissue of 1974 title) 

 David Wallechinsky, Michael Sheldin and Saunie Salyer, Laughing Gas: Nitrous Oxide (1993 reprint of earlier work)
 Robert Anton Wilson, The Illuminati Papers (1980)

References

External links

Book publishing companies based in Berkeley, California
Publishing companies established in 1983
1983 establishments in California
Small press publishing companies